Dos corazones y un cielo is a 1959 Mexican musical-comedy film directed by Rafael Baledón and starring Demetrio González, Eulalio González, and Rosa de Castilla. It also features the last appearance of Carlos Orellana.

Plot
The married life of singers Antonio Castillo (Demetrio González) and Isabel del Río (Rosa de Castilla) isn't as successful as their professional careers—that is because of their mutual jealousy and criticism. As if things weren't to drastic already, Isabel's cousin Felipe Treviño (Eulalio González) arrives from his hometown after a devastating epidemic and decides to move in with them. After a trip to Santa María del Maíz, Antonio's hometown, Antonio and Isabel find themselves to be the victims of a career separation unintentionally orchestrated by Felipe. Both singers decide to go solo separate ways, Isabel tackles theatre with Spanish businessman César Ordóñez (Carlos Agostí), while Antonio tries luck as a tenor under the instruction of Italian chocolate magnate Dina Castellammare (Rosa Elena Durgel). However Felipe plans cunning ways to join the singers back into matrimonial harmony.

Cast
Demetrio González as Antonio Castillo  
Rosa de Castilla as Isabel del Río  
Eulalio González as Felipe Treviño  
Rosa Elena Durgel as Dina Castellammare  
Carlos Agostí as César Ordóñez  
Roy Fletcher as Cabaret host   
José Loza as Auditorium representative     
Willie Wilhelmy as Theatrical representative   
Rubén Zepeda Novelo as Television reporter
Carlos Orellana as Atanacio Turrubiates  
Armando Arriola as Italian art director of "Chocolatitos Milan"
Polo Ortín as Cabaret waiter
Aurora Huerta as Hermanita Velázquez (uncredited)
Luz Huerta as Hermanita Velázquez (uncredited)
Florencio Castelló as César's attendant (uncredited)
Jorge Lavat Second auditorium representative (uncredited)

References

External links

Mexican musical comedy films
1959 films